Weinmannia stenocarpa is a species of plant in the family Cunoniaceae. It is endemic to Ecuador.  Its natural habitats are subtropical or tropical moist montane forests and subtropical or tropical high-altitude shrubland.

References

stenocarpa
Endemic flora of Ecuador
Vulnerable flora of South America
Taxonomy articles created by Polbot